Lac de Lamoura is a lake at Lamoura in the Jura department of France. It is the highest lake in the Jura at an elevation of 1156 metres.

Lamoura
Natura 2000 in France